Time is an Academy Award-nominated 2020 American documentary film produced and directed by Garrett Bradley. It follows Sibil Fox Richardson, fighting for the release of her husband, Rob, who was serving a 60-year prison sentence for engaging in an armed bank robbery.

Sibil Fox served three and a half years for her role in the armed robbery. Louisiana Governor John Bel Edwards granted Rob clemency in 2018 after serving 21 years in prison for his crimes.

The film had its world premiere at the Sundance Film Festival on January 25, 2020, where Bradley won the US Documentary Directing Award, the first African-American woman to do so. It was released theatrically on October 9, 2020, and digitally on Amazon Prime Video on October 16, 2020 by Amazon Studios. Although the film was nominated for Best Documentary Feature at the 93rd Academy Awards, it became one of the few documentary films to ever sweep "The Big Four" critics awards (LA, NBR, NY, NSFC).

Synopsis
The film follows Sibil Fox Richardson (also known as Fox Rich), an entrepreneur, self-described abolitionist, author, and mother of six, as she fights for the release of her husband, Rob, serving a 60-year prison sentence in the Louisiana State Penitentiary for his participation in an armed bank robbery. Rich served three and a half years for her role in the robbery while Rob was granted clemency in 2018. The film combines original footage with home videos.

Production
Bradley met Rich in 2016 while working on her short film Alone, a New York Times Op-Doc. She intended to make a short documentary about Rich, but when shooting wrapped, Rich gave Bradley a bag of mini-DV tapes containing some 100 hours of home videos she had recorded over the previous 18 years. At that point, Bradley developed the short as a feature.

Time was shot on a Sony FS7 camera in black and white. It was selected for the 2019 Sundance Documentary Edit & Story Lab. The score features original compositions by Jamieson Shaw and Edwin Montgomery, as well as music by Emahoy Tsegué-Maryam Guèbrou that was recorded in the 1960s. The film was produced by Lauren Domino, Kellen Quinn, and Bradley. Laurene Powell Jobs, Davis Guggenheim, Nicole Stott, Rahdi Taylor, and Kathleen Lingo are executive producers, Jonathan Silberberg and Shannon Dill are co-executive producers, and Dan Janvey is co-producer.

Release
Time had its world premiere at the Sundance Film Festival on January 25, 2020. In February 2020, Amazon Studios acquired its distribution rights. It also screened at the New York Film Festival on September 20, 2020. It was released theatrically on October 9, 2020, and on Amazon Prime Video on October 16, 2020.

Home media 
In March 2021, it was announced that Time, One Night in Miami... and Sound of Metal would receive DVD and Blu-Ray release by the Criterion Collection.

Reception

Critical response
The site's critics consensus reads: "Time delivers a powerful broadside against the flaws of the American justice system -- and chronicles one family's refusal to give up against all odds." At Metacritic the film has a weighted average score of 91 out of 100, based on 23 critics, indicating "universal acclaim".

Peter Debruge of Variety wrote that the film "will almost certainly rewire how Americans think about the prison-industrial complex" as it "challenges the assumption that incarceration makes the world a safer place." Sheri Linden of The Hollywood Reporter called the film "gripping," describing it as a "concise and impressionistic account of love and waiting, of the American justice system and the fight to keep a family whole." David Ehrlich of Indiewire gave it an A- and wrote, "Bradley's monumental and enormously moving Time doesn't juxtapose the pain of yesterday against the hope of tomorrow so much as it insists upon a perpetual now. And while the documentary never reduces its subjects to mere symbols of the oppression they represent – the film couldn't be more personal, and it builds to a moment of such unvarnished intimacy that you can hardly believe what you're watching."

Justin Chang of the Los Angeles Times said the film is "a dazzling formal feat, but more than that, it's a profoundly sad movie about what it means to grow up without a father, to absorb that blow continually, day after day." Ashley Clark of Filmmaker magazine wrote that the film's "graceful compositions, flowing sonic landscape and at times breathtaking interpolation of Fox Rich's home video archive footage cohere to form a singularly powerful experience."

Kevin Jagernauth of The Playlist, however, stated that the film "wants the viewer to empathize with the very turmoil this family endured" yet felt that there were many gaps left unsolved (Robert turning down the plea bargain, Rich's nephew accompanying the robbery and so on).

Accolades
At the 2020 Sundance Film Festival, Bradley won the Directing Award in the U.S. Documentary competition, becoming the first African-American woman to win in that category. At the 2020 Full Frame Documentary Film Festival, the film won the Center for Documentary Studies Filmmaker Award and the Charles E. Guggenheim Emerging Artist Award. It won the James Blue Award at the 2020 Ashland Independent Film Festival.

References

External links
 Time at Amazon Prime Video
 
 
 Official trailer

2020 films
2020 documentary films
African-American films
American documentary films
Amazon Studios films
Collage film
Documentary films about incarceration in the United States
Documentary films about law in the United States
Films by African-American directors
Films shot in Louisiana
Peabody Award-winning broadcasts
Sundance Film Festival award winners
2020 independent films
2020s English-language films
2020s American films